Zharovikha is a rural locality (a village) in Kichmengskoye Rural Settlement, Kichmengsko-Gorodetsky District, Vologda Oblast, Russia. The population was 22 as of 2002.

Geography 
Zharovikha is located 19 km south of Kichmengsky Gorodok (the district's administrative centre) by road. Malinovitsa is the nearest rural locality.

References 

Rural localities in Kichmengsko-Gorodetsky District